The 1985 Ohio Valley Conference men's basketball tournament was the final event of the 1984–85 season in the Ohio Valley Conference. The tournament was held March 1–3, 1985, at the Murphy Center in Murfreesboro, Tennessee.

Middle Tennessee State defeated  in the championship game, 66–63, to win their third OVC men's basketball tournament.

The Blue Raiders received an automatic bid to the 1985 NCAA tournament as the No. 15 seed in the Southeast region.

Bracket

References

Ohio Valley Conference men's basketball tournament
Tournament
Ohio Valley Conference men's basketball tournament
Ohio Valley Conference men's basketball tournament